The Beaches of Agnès is a 2008 French documentary film directed by Agnès Varda. The film is an autobiographical essay where Varda revisits places from her past, reminisces about life and celebrates her 80th birthday on camera. Varda said it would most likely be her last film, but released the Oscar-nominated documentary Faces Places a decade later.

Style
Varda uses a wide variety of techniques, combining still images of people, including her past friends, collaborators, lovers and family, with what Claude Lévi-Strauss might term bricolage of garage-sale items, trinkets, and colorful memorabilia juxtaposed in creative combinations, and combines beautiful images in a collage format which revolves around the theme of beaches. In the opening shots, she has assistants film her bringing mirrors to a beach in Belgium which she used to visit as a young girl; one mirror is on the sand as a wave washes over it. She captures a creative French artistic sensibility with a sincere and playful appreciation for the beauty of film and art and a joie de vivre.

Reception
The New York Times critic Manohla Dargis wrote in 2009:
... It is at once an illustration of the fine art of foraging and an autobiographical portrait, narrated by its self-described “little old lady, pleasantly plump.” ...  Ms. Varda is picking through the world, close to home and far afield, finding images that please her and give her pause ... that she scrutinizes with rue if no obvious regret. But here the emphasis is on her own life and the images and memories that, with time, have blurred together. ... The images are as delightful, unexpected and playfully uninhibited ... At one point, she says she thinks of all men who look at the sea as Ulysses (she’s an aquatic soul), but she’s every bit the wanderer. Whether she’s roving a beach with a camera or rummaging through flea markets, she seeks and finds, gleaning — the word means to collect and examine — what this world of wonders has in store.

References

External links

https://web.archive.org/web/20100305115741/http://www.cinemaguild.com/beachesofagnes/

Films directed by Agnès Varda
Films shot in Corse-du-Sud
Autobiographical documentary films
French documentary films
2000s French films